Oregonichthys is a genus of ray-finned fish in the family Cyprinidae. Collectively known as  Oregon chubs, that term can also refer to O. crameri in particular.

Species 
 Oregonichthys crameri (Snyder, 1908) (Oregon chub)
 Oregonichthys kalawatseti Markle, Pearsons & D. T. Bills, 1991 (Umpqua chub)

References

External links

 
Freshwater fish of the United States
Taxonomy articles created by Polbot